The Dark Swan is a 1924 American drama film directed by Millard Webb and written by Frederick J. Jackson. It is based on the 1924 novel The Dark Swan by Ernest Pascal. The film stars Marie Prevost, Monte Blue, Helene Chadwick, John Patrick, Lilyan Tashman, and Vera Lewis. The film was released by Warner Bros. on November 26, 1924.

Plot
As described in a review in a film magazine, because she is a clever vamp, Eve Quinn (Prevost) has generally had her way with men, while her sister Cornelia (Chadwick), a quiet, deep-thinking girl, cannot bring herself to deliberately pursue them. So Eve wins Lewis Dike (Blue), who Cornelia loves. Immediately after her marriage, Eve begins a series of dangerous adventures with Wilfred Meadows (Patrick). Lewis learns of them and endeavors to reason with his wife, but she will not listen to him. As Cornelia plans to sail for Europe, Lewis meets her at the dock. He tells her that he has made a mistake in marrying Eve, that they are to be divorced, and that he loves Cornelia. They part with mutual assurances of a future meeting.

Cast

Box Office
According to Warner Bros., the film earned $224,000 domestically and $37,000 in foreign markets.

Preservation
With no prints of The Dark Swan located in any film archives, it is a lost film.

References

External links
 

1924 films
Lost American films
1920s English-language films
Silent American drama films
1924 drama films
Warner Bros. films
Films directed by Millard Webb
American silent feature films
American black-and-white films
1924 lost films
Lost drama films
1920s American films